Beatrice Power Station is a natural gas-fired combined cycle power station in Gage County, Nebraska, United States. It has installed capacity of 250 MW, including two combustion turbines with capacity of 80 MW each and one steam turbine with capacity of 90 MW, provided by Alstom.  The project was approved in April 2002, construction of the power station started on June 26, 2003, and it was commissioned on January 7, 2005.

References

External links

Energy infrastructure completed in 2005
Natural gas-fired power stations in Nebraska
Buildings and structures in Gage County, Nebraska
2005 establishments in Nebraska